Mechthild Rawert (born 3 November 1957) is a German politician of the Social Democratic Party (SPD) wh served as a member of the Bundestag from 2005 until 2017 and again from 2020 to 2021, representing Berlin's Tempelhof-Schöneberg district.

Early life and career 
Rawert was born in Coesfeld, North Rhine-Westphalia. She holds a degree in adult education from the Free University of Berlin.

Political career 
Rawert was a member of the German Bundestag from 2005 until 2017. During that time, she served on the Committee on Health (2005–2017) and the Committee on Food and Agriculture (2005–2009). In addition to her committee assignments, she chaired the German-Maltese Parliamentary Friendship Group from 2014 until 2017.

Also from 2014 until 2018, Rawert was a member of the German delegation to the Parliamentary Assembly of the Council of Europe (PACE). In the Assembly, she serves on the Sub-Committee on Disability and Inclusion.

In 2020, Rawert returned to parliament when she succeeded Eva Högl who had resigned her seat. In parliament, she briefly served on the Committee on Legal Affairs and Consumer Protection.

In the negotiations to form a coalition government between the Christian Democratic Union (CDU) and the SPD under the leadership of Kai Wegner following Berlin’s 2023 state elections, Rawert was part of her party’s delegation to the working group on labour and social affairs, co-chaired by Ottilie Klein and Lars Düsterhöft.

Other activities 
 German Foundation for World Population (DSW), Member of the Parliamentary Advisory Board (2020–2021)
 Magnus Hirschfeld Foundation, Member of the Board of Trustees (2014–2018)
 German Catholic Women's Association (KDFB), Member
 German Federation for the Environment and Nature Conservation (BUND), Member
 German United Services Trade Union (ver.di), Member
 German War Graves Commission, Member
 Gegen Vergessen – Für Demokratie, Member
 Pro Asyl, Member
 Social Association of Germany (SoVD), Member

References

External links 

  
 Bundestag biography 

21st-century German women politicians
Members of the Bundestag for Berlin
Female members of the Bundestag

Members of the Bundestag 2017–2021
Members of the Bundestag 2013–2017
Members of the Bundestag 2009–2013
Members of the Bundestag 2005–2009
Social Democratic Party of Germany politicians
1957 births
Living people